Rıdvan is the Turkish spelling of the Arabic masculine given name Ridwan (Arabic: رِضْوَان riḍwān) which the name also derived from the Islamic angel Ridwan and means "grace, pleasure, satisfaction and paradise". Notable people with the name include:

 Ridvan Tezcan (born 1991), Turkish/Swedish football player

 Rıdvan Baygut (born 1985), Turkish taekwondo practitioner
 Rıdvan Bolatlı (born 1928), Turkish former footballer
 Rıdvan Dilmen (born 1962), Turkish former footballer
 Rıdvan Şimşek (born 1991), Turkish footballer
 Rıdvan Yılmaz (born 2001), Turkish footballer

See also
 Garden of Ridván (disambiguation), two holy places in the Bahá'í Faith
 Redouane
 Ridwan (disambiguation)
 Rizwan (disambiguation)

Turkish masculine given names